The River Finnan is a river in Highland, Scotland that flows the Glen Finnan glen (valley). Rising from the waters of two streams near Corryhully, one named Allt a' Chaol Ghlinne, the River Finnan drains into Loch Shiel. It flows underneath the Glenfinnan Viaduct at Glenfinnan.

References 

Rivers of Highland